Prince Dmitri may refer to:

Dmitry Donskoy (1350–1389), Prince of Moscow
Prince Dmitri Alexandrovich of Russia (1901–1980), nephew of Tsar Nicholas II of Russia

See also
Prince Dimitri Romanov (1926-2016), Russian prince, philanthropist and author. 
Dimitri (disambiguation)